Santadi is a comune (municipality) in the Province of South Sardinia in the Italian region Sardinia, located about  southwest of Cagliari and about  southeast of Carbonia.

Santadi borders the following municipalities: Assemini, Domus de Maria, Nuxis, Piscinas, Pula, Teulada, Villa San Pietro, Villaperuccio.

Starting from a hill next to the small town of Santadi, it is possible to see how the urban development system develops in concentric circles. This fact gave rise to the hypothesis that Santadi is what remains of the capital of the island mentioned by Plato in the third chapter of the Timaeus and in Critias.

References

Cities and towns in Sardinia